Football is the most popular sport in Romania. The Romanian Football Federation ( or FRF), a member of UEFA, is the sport's national governing body.

History

The pre-war period 
The Bucharest architect Gheorghe Radu Stănculescu discovered in a document from the archives of the British Navy that English sailors were playing football in the Danube area in 1865. This detail emerges from a document from the archives of the British Navy. It is a report by the commander of the military ship HMS "Cockatrice", marine lieutenant Gillson, addressed to Admiral Lord Paget, commander of the Mediterranean Fleet of the "Royal Navy". In his report dated January 26, 1866 (see facsimiles), Lieutenant Gillson disclosed that he had ordered "the vessel's usual anchorage to be changed to another place, where she was now exposed to the breezes, and near which was a field which served as an excellent recreation ground for cricket, quoits and football". 

Another article from the press of the time from 1888 mentioned that in Arad, "a group of young people was hitting the ball". In 1890, the dentist Iuliu Weiner brought to Arad - from London, where he had studied in England - the first rules of the game written on paper, as well as the first "real" soccer ball on the territory of today's Romania. (Until then, the balls were "improvised"). Weiner promotes the new game, demonstrating its practice on the field in front of the current Arada high school no. 1. 

On June 25, 1899, in Timișoara, the first football match on the current territory of Romania was organized on the Velocitas field, between students of the 6th and 7th grades of the Piarist High School, under the leadership of Professor Karl Müller. This was the first football match that respected the rules of the game from that period, although football had been played in Bucharest since 1885, in the area of ​​the "Bolta Rece" restaurant (in the area where the Arc de Triomphe is located today). On April 26, 1902, in Timișoara, young people from the Iosefin neighborhood founded the Timișoara Football Club, later the Timișoara Athletic Club. It was the first exclusive football club founded on today's territory of Romania. But the first interclub football match took place on August 20, 1902, on the field at Pădurea Verde, in front of 100 spectators. FC Timișoara lost to Reuniunea de Sport Lugoj with a score of 2-3. 

In Cluj, as early as 1875, sports tournaments of the city's multi-sport clubs were organized. Football was not allowed within the city limits, so the games took place on the meadow to the east (today Nicolae Titulescu Boulevard). Since 1900, football matches have also taken place within these events, with the winners receiving silver medals and the finalists bronze. From the 1907-1908 season , the first official matches on the territory of our country took place in Cluj, within the second Hungarian league, followed the following season in Arad.

The first official football match in the Kingdom of Romania was played in 1907 near Kiseleff Street, Bucharest on an improvised pitch. The Romanians just watched. The competitors were English and German, employed in the textile or oil industry in Bucharest, Ploiesti or Câmpina. The chronicle of that game, published in the extraordinary magazine "From the world of sports", is considered a birth certificate for Romanian football. 

The first domestic football competition was the ASAR Cup (Association of Athletic Societies of Romania), founded in October 1909. It included three clubs: Colentina and Olimpia from Bucharest (which won the title), and United from Ploiesti .

The interwar period 
The first national championship Division A with all the reunited territories was in the 1921-22 season, and the most successful Romanian teams from the interwar period are Venus Bucharest , with seven titles, Chinezul Timișoara with six (consecutive) titles and Ripensia Timișoara with four. Since 1934, the Romanian Cup has also been held, the first winner being Ripensia Timișoara. Also in that season, the B division was established, followed two years later by the C division.
In 1930 and 1934, the Romanian national team participated in the world championships.

At the end of the 30s, the Romanian teams make their debut in the European cups, a resounding victory achieved by Ripensia defeating AC Milan 3-0.

The post-war period 
After the war, teams like UTA Arad , FC Argeș Pitești and the University of Craiova win the championship and qualify for the upper stages of European competitions.

The most famous football club in Romania is Steaua Bucharest , which in 1986 was the first team from Eastern Europe and the only one from Romania to win the European Champions Cup .  Also, in 1989 he played another European Champions Cup final.  It is the club with the most titles, 25, and the most Romanian Cups , 21. Steaua also managed to equal the performance of Chinese Timișoara, winning the title 6 times in a row between 1992-98.

Stele's rivals, Dinamo Bucharest , won 18 titles and 13 cups, and played a semi-final of the European Champions Cup in 1984, and in 1990 the semi -final of the UEFA Cup Winners' Cup . 

Under the management of Walter Zenga , Steaua qualified for the UEFA Cup groups in the 2004–05 season, with Zenga qualifying a Romanian team in the "European Spring" for the first time since 1993 (when Steaua also reached the quarter-finals of the Cup Winners' Cup ). Since 2006, League I is composed of 18 teams, of which the last 4 are relegated. This year the championship changed its name from Division A to League I. In the 2005-2006 season , Steaua Bucharest and Rapid Bucharest reached the quarter-finals of the 2006 UEFA Cup. Steaua reached the semi-finals of the UEFA Cup, being eliminated on the edge of Middlesbrough FCand qualified three times in a row in the groups of the Champions League.  Among the outstanding matches in the League are those with Dynamo Kyiv , score 4-1 and with Lyon, 1-1.

At the start of the 2006–07 season , the competition was forced to change its name from Division A to League I due to a trademark dispute over the name. In the new format, Dinamo Bucharest won its 18th title in history, 16th in a row for teams from Bucharest. CFR Cluj opened the way for a decade of dominance in the province, teams like Unirea Urziceni , Oțelul Galați , Astra Giurgiu or Viitorul Constanța won the title for the first time in history.  Unirea Urziceni accumulated 8 points, a record for Romania in the league groups.  CFR Clujwas the most prolific club in the last two decades, winning 8 championships,  4 cups and 2 super cups. CFR Cluj also produced some records, 10 points in the Champions League groups, 12 points in the Europa League groups  and 10 points in the Conference League groups  and a premiere, it was the first club from the province to win the Romanian Super Cup.

Among the most important players in the domestic championship in recent history are Ionel Danciulescu with the most appearances (515) and Eric de Oliveira foreign player with the most goals scored in League I (66).

National championship 

Professional league football began in Romania as Divizia A in 1909. The name of the top-flight league was changed to Liga I before the 2006–07 season. Currently, domestic play is organized in a four tier league system comprising Liga I, Liga II, Liga III, and various county leagues.

SuperLiga României 
The country's top-flight division is SuperLiga României. The league contains 18 teams, with the champion going into the 3rd qualify round in the UEFA Champions League. The runner-up starts in the second qualify round in the UEFA Europa League, where the 3rd enter the first qualify round. Steaua București is the most successful club in the history of Liga I, having won 23 league championships and being runner-up 12 times. Dinamo București is the only other club with sustained success in Liga I, having won 18 titles. The four clubs at the bottom of the league table are relegated to Liga II.

Lower divisions
Liga II is divided into two parallel divisions due to economic and logistic reasons, each division containing 16 teams. The top two teams in each division are promoted to Liga I, while the bottom three teams from each division are relegated to Liga III. The second division is currently undergoing format changes, and is expected to consist of a single division of 20-22 teams in the near future.

Liga III contains 108 teams split into six divisions of 18 teams each. The top club from each division is promoted to Liga II. Additionally, two separate three-team playoffs are held involving the second placed clubs from each division, with the playoff winners also being promoted. The bottom three teams from each division are relegated to the county leagues in addition to three of the 15th-placed teams.

Cup competitions 
In addition to league, there are three major cup competitions: the Cupa României, open to all Romanian professional football clubs, the Supercupa României, which matches the champions of Liga I and the winners of the Cupa României, and the Cupa Ligii. In case the same team achieves the double by winning both the Liga I and Cupa României, the Supercupa is disputed between that club and the league's runner-up.

Qualification for European competitions

Romania national football team

The Romania national football team played its first match in 1922 and is one of only four national teams to have taken part in the first three World Cups, the other three being Brazil, France, and Belgium. Overall, they have played in seven World Cups, most recently in 1998. They have also competed in four European Championships, most recently in 2016. The team's most successful period was in the 1990s when, led by Gheorghe Hagi, they reached the quarterfinals of the 1994 World Cup. They also reached the last 16 of the 1998 World Cup, and the quarter-finals of Euro 2000.

World Cup squads 

 1930 FIFA World Cup
 1934 FIFA World Cup
 1938 FIFA World Cup
 1970 FIFA World Cup
 1990 FIFA World Cup
 1994 FIFA World Cup
 1998 FIFA World Cup

European Champions squads 

 UEFA Euro 1984
 UEFA Euro 1996
 UEFA Euro 2000
 UEFA Euro 2008
 UEFA Euro 2016

Domestic football
Many old, traditional teams in the first division have experienced financial difficulties, eventually leading to relegation and even dissolution, such as Politehnica Timișoara, Universitatea Cluj, Universitatea Craiova, Rapid București, Petrolul Ploieşti, FC Brașov, FC Argeş, Oţelul Galaţi, Ceahlăul Piatra Neamţ, Politehnica Iaşi and Pandurii Târgu Jiu. They were replaced by teams with less tradition in the first level of the Romanian league system, such as Botoşani, Concordia Chiajna, Dunărea Călărași, Hermannstadt Sibiu, Juventus București, Viitorul Constanța, Sepsi Sfântu Gheorghe or Voluntari.

Dissolved traditional teams were usually re-founded by supporters' associations or by municipalities. The fact that they bore similar names and colors to the original teams made neutral fans call them "clones". Some of these teams later re-gained the record and official name of the original ones.

The country's most successful team, Steaua București, also lost the right to use its name (and logo) and changed it to FCSB.

A number of modern stadiums have been built in the country, with the most notable examples being Arena Naţională, Cluj Arena, Ilie Oană Stadium, Stadionul Ion Oblemenco, Stadionul Tudor Vladimirescu and Stadionul Francisc von Neuman.

Largest Romanian football stadiums

See also

 Romanian Professional Football League
 Sport in Romania
 Match fixing in Romanian football
 Romanian Football Federation
 Romania national football team
 Romania national football team players
 Romania national under-21 football team
 Romania women's national football team
 Romanian football league system
 List of football stadiums in Romania

References

External links
 Romanian National League

 

lt:Rumunijos futbolo sistema